Zwei Münchners in Hamburg (Two Münchners in Hamburg), was a German television series aired from 1989 to 1993 in three seasons. It is based on a book by Karl Heinz Freynik.

The series was directed by Rolf von Sydow, Peter German, Celino Bleiweiß and Wilfried Dotzel. Originally, the episodes had a length of about 50 minutes. For subsequent airings, abridged versions of about 45 minutes were developed, which also included shorter credits than the original version.

Plot
The preppy Julia Heininger (Uschi Glas), Deputy Head of the Central Bank of Bavaria in Munich gets the job, the bank branch in Hamburg to lead. She is not enthusiastic about the proposal initially because they behind this SCTC in the far north of their counterparties Bavarian Dr. Ralf-Maria Sagerer (Elmar Wepper) suspected. But after many board members have little confidence in a woman as a bank director, and Dr. Sagerer continues to make against Julia mood, sends the Munich headquarters Julia's nemesis personally to Hamburg einzubremsen Juliet "Alternative" projects something.

Julia moves with her 12-year-old son Maxie and their feisty housekeeper Fanny (Enzi Fuchs) in an Art Nouveau detached in Hamburg-Winterhude. In the neighborhood of caterers Alfred Haack lives (Heinz Reincke), the call to all local manner "Vadder Haack". The convivial mid-sixties belongs to the family soon, especially with Fanny connects him a heart friendship.

The fate of the two takes its course and Juliet must understand that Ralf is in fact a very patenter guy. The two come despite Ralf's Italian girlfriend Beatrice (Anita Zagaria) and many misconceptions soon detail. An important role is played by the charming private banker Thaddaeus van Daalen (Johannes Heesters) of his wayward son Hendrik (Volkert Kraeft) finally wants to get under the hood. The captured Julia's heart would have liked, but only wins their friendship. In Beatrice, he finally finds a woman for life.

Julia's relationship to the bank's management could not be better: Director Bernhard Schwaiger (Hans Reiser) gets married soon after the death of his wife Julia's mother Hermione (Winnie Markus), which operates a nice hotel on the Tegernsee. My greatest wish would be if Julia would once started her work. Your servant Toni (Max Grießer), which transports guests with the coach, it's a loyal friend and adviser. Mountain heights maintains Father Roch (Willy Harlander) a hermitage, it Hein Festinger always looking for then when you burn something on the soul.

The bank operate the affable Kuno Gram eggs (Toni Berger), also a (upper) Bayer far from home, the industrious secretary Mrs. Heise (Karin Rasenack) and the discrete as tradition-conscious concierge Lohlein (Günther Jerschke). They are loyal to the new arrivals page. A frequent guest in the house Sagerer-Heininger is Sascha (Wolfgang Fierek), Ralf leichtblütiger brother, who ekes out a living artist in Hamburg. Like his brother, he is a passionate motorcyclist.

Again and again decides to move the family to the Bavarian mountains, the second major scene of the series, where Van Daalen senior goes into the care of Hermione after his retirement from business life. After director Schwaiger retirement takes an ambitious and brash Dr. wet Fiedler (Sky du Mont) the scepter in the Munich headquarters. Julia, who is a fighter for the interests of ordinary people against humanity merit pursuit, makes for some courageous alone and of various disagreements with Dr. Fiedler soon independently. Its successor is the distinctive Manager Dr. Kaulbach (Eva Kryll), with Julia after initial suspicion but gets along very well.

There is a lot of trouble to Ralf's birth certificate: He was in fact born in Czechoslovakia and undocumented, there is no wedding. Thanks to Sasha's meager knowledge of Czech and recharger bureaucratic obstacles they have to be postponed several times. Soon there will be offspring: daughter Marie-Therese first Ralf makes the proud father. A ski holiday with unexpected twist, a California special journey and many complications with bank customers keep the television family on their toes.

Distribution
The series is now fully released on DVD, the original, uncut version of the episodes was used. Since 19 December 2005 was the first season available on four DVDs, which contains the pilot movie "Farewell to the Isar" and twelve episodes. The total running time is 630 minutes. The second season followed on 6 August 2007, Season 3 on 10 March 2008. They consist of four DVDs and contain the consequences of 13 to 24 (total running time 607 minutes), respectively 25 to 37 (540 minutes). The 26 December 1991 and first broadcast on 18 December 2005 reiterated Special "The biggest festival of the year - Christmas at our television family" was on 8 October 2007 as bonus material with the 3rd (DVD) season of the series " The Black Forest Clinic " was published.

See also
List of German television series

External links
 

German television soap operas
Television shows set in Hamburg
1989 German television series debuts
1993 German television series endings
German-language television shows
ZDF original programming